Isabelle Valdéz Santana (born August 10, 1981), better known as Isabelle, is a Dominican singer of Christian music. She is the Christian music singer with the highest number of nominations for the Soberano Awards (nine times): 2007 (when it was still called the Casandra Awards), 2010, 2011, 2013, 2015, 2018, 2019, 2020 and 2021, being the winner in the 2021 edition as "Singer of Christian music".

Musical career 
She made her debut on the music scene in 1998, with his first record production "Algodón", which made him known as one of the most prominent figures of Christian music in the Dominican Republic.

In 2017, singer Isabelle said in a video that she turned down an offer to join the famous group Camila in an interview conducted on the Famosos Inside program on CDN. The news reached the ears of Mario Domm, leader of the group, who in his official Instagram account denied this publication made by Isabelle. Mario Domm withdrew the publication when communicating with Isabelle, because he understood that the news was true, it was not the group itself who contacted the singer, but the group's record label.

His next album, "Tiempos de Cambio", was promoted with various singles since 2017, these being "Por Ti Peleo Yo", a song authored by Juan Carlos Rodríguez of the duo Tercer Cielo, and "Creer En Ti" in 2019.

In addition to being nominated for the Soberano Awards, in 2018 she won three statuettes in the El Galardón Awards, recognition of Christian art and communication in the Dominican Republic, as female singer and song of the year "Por ti peleo yo" (For you I fought). For her 20-year career in music, she received an award from the "Christian Academy of Art Chroniclers", ACCRA. In 2018, Isabelle brought together great artists of Christian and secular music for a great concert entitled "Aquí Estoy" (in English, “Here I am”), an event that would be held for free at the La Victoria Prison.

In 2020, during the world pandemic period declared by the WHO, the singer was very active making social and musical contributions. He started a rescue campaign called "Código SOS" (in English, "SOS Code"), to gather hundreds of people in a prayer of 24 hours of continuous prayer, which has also formed an instant help team with food and medicine, for those who request it through the "Código SOS". The singer also proposed the "Ayuno 7x7", motivating her followers to join in this action of faith, which will last seven days, where Christian music, prayer and praise will be the comfort. Also, Valdez released his song «No me tocará» (in English, "not touch me"), a song of strength for the difficult time the world is experiencing due to the pandemic decreed that same year. Later, together with Sarah La Profeta, they perform a musical theme entitled «No tengo miedo» (in English, “I am not afraid”), with which they seek to carry a message of strength and hope in the midst of the current pandemic.

Discography
Regresará (2005)
Algodón (2004)
Apóyate de mi (2009)  
El Tiempo Llegó (2011)
Tiempos de Cambio (2019)

Collaborations 
She has made collaborations with Tercer Cielo, Marcos Yaroide, René González, Roberto Orellana, Redimi2, Henry G, Ariel Kelly, Johan Paulino, 3C, Dianne de Jesús, among others.

Awards and nominations 
She is the singer with the highest number of nominations in the Contemporary Religious Music category of the Soberano Awards, equaled by Marcos Yaroide.

She has been nominated several times for Arpa Awards in Mexico, as Best Album, Best Singer. She has been awarded at the Costa Rica's Unción Awards for Best Album and Best Singer, Best Song; in Panama, as Best Singer and Best Album “Apóyate En Mí”; in Curaçao, as Best Album, Best Singer.

References

1981 births
Living people
21st-century Dominican Republic women singers
Dominican Republic Christians
Dominican Republic performers of Christian music
People from Duarte Province